Turks in Venezuela or Turkish Venezuelans are Turkish people who have immigrated to Venezuela. However, the term also refers to Venezuelan-born persons who have Turkish parents or who have a Turkish ancestral background. The Turkish community is largely made up of immigrants, or the descendants of immigrants, born in the Ottoman Empire before 1923, in the Republic of Turkey since then, or in neighbouring countries once part of the Ottoman Empire that still have some Turkish population. An estimated 27,000 Turkish Venezuelan people live in the country.

See also 
 Turkey–Venezuela relations

References

Venezuela
Ethnic groups in Venezuela